This article contains information about the literary events and publications of 1796.

Events
Samuel Ireland publishes a collection of Shakespearean forgeries in his Miscellaneous Papers and Legal Instruments Under the Hand and Seal of William Shakespeare (dated this year but actually produced on 24 December 1795). Edmond Malone exposes them in his An Inquiry into the Authenticity of Certain Miscellaneous Papers and Legal Instruments on 31 March, and the forged 'Shakespearean' play, Vortigern and Rowena, is able to sustain just a single performance at the Theatre Royal, Drury Lane, London, on 2 April. Ireland's son, William Henry, confesses to the fraud in An Authentic Account of the Shakespearean Manuscripts.
January – Charles Lamb ends a six-week spell in a mental asylum at Hoxton (London).
February 29 – The Biblioteca Nacional de Portugal is established as the Royal Public Library of the Court in Lisbon.
March 1 – Samuel Taylor Coleridge launches his periodical The Watchman; it lasts for only ten issues. In April his first verse collection, Poems on Various Subjects, is published in London.
July 21 – The Scottish national poet, Robert Burns, dies in Dumfries at the age of 37. His funeral (with honours as a military volunteer) takes place on July 25, while his wife, Jean, is in labour with their ninth child together, Maxwell. Burns is at first buried in the far corner of St Michael's Churchyard in Dumfries. The volume of The Scots Musical Museum published this year includes his versions of "Auld Lang Syne" and "Charlie Is My Darling".
July 30 – A performance of a historical drama, Jane Shore, is given in Sydney, Australia; the playbill, printed by George Hughes, is the earliest known surviving item printed in that country.
September 22 – Mary Lamb commits matricide.
October
Jane Austen begins writing First Impressions, the first version of Pride and Prejudice (published 1813).
Caroline von Wolzogen's novel Agnes von Lilien begins anonymous serialization in the monthly Die Horen, edited by her brother-in-law Friedrich Schiller.

New books

Fiction
Robert Bage – Hermsprong: or, Man As He Is Not
Elizabeth Bonhôte – Bungay Castle
Fanny Burney – Camilla
Denis Diderot (died 1784) – Jacques the Fatalist (the first complete edition of the original French, Jacques le fataliste et son maître)
Marquis Carl von Grosse (translated by Peter Will) – Horrid Mysteries (translation of Der Genius)
Elizabeth Hamilton – Translation of the Letters of a Hindoo Rajah
Mary Hays – Memoirs of Emma Courtney
Elizabeth Inchbald – Nature and Art
Matthew Lewis – The Monk
Eliza Parsons – The Mysterious Warning, a German Tale
Regina Maria Roche – The Children of the Abbey: a Tale
Jane West (as Prudentia Homespun) – A Gossip's Story, and a Legendary Tale

Children
François Guillaume Ducray-Duminil – Victor, ou l’Enfant de la forêt (Victor, or The Child of the Forest)
Maria Edgeworth – The Parent's Assistant (stories, second volume later in the year)
Jane West – A Gossip's Story, and a Legendary Tale (as Prudentia Homespun)

Drama
Richard Cumberland 
 Don Pedro
 The Days of Yore
Johann Wolfgang von Goethe – Egmont
 Thomas Holcroft 
 The Force of Ridicule
 The Man of Ten Thousand
William Henry Ireland –  Vortigern and Rowena
 Robert Jephson – The Conspiracy
 Sophia Lee – Almeyda, Queen of Granada
 Thomas Morton – The Way to Get Married 
Frederic Reynolds – Fortune's Fool  
Mary Darby Robinson – The Sicilian Lover
The Iron Chest (adaptation of William Godwin's novel Caleb Williams)

Poetry

Non-fiction
Ralph Broome
Observations on Mr. Paine's Pamphlet Entitled the Decline and Fall of the English System of Finance...
Strictures on Mr. Burke's Two Letters, Addressed to a Member of the Present Parliament
Edmund Burke – A Letter from The Right Honourable Edmund Burke to a Noble Lord, on the Attacks made upon him and his pension
Edward Gibbon – Memoirs of My Life and Writings
Susannah Willard Johnson – A Narrative of the Captivity of Mrs. Johnson (edited by John Curtis Chamberlain)
John Gabriel Stedman – The Narrative of a Five Years Expedition against the Revolted Negroes of Surinam
Mary Wollstonecraft – Letters Written in Sweden, Norway, and Denmark

Births
January 4 – Henry George Bohn, English bibliographer and publisher (died 1884)
February 17 – Charlotte Anley, English didactic novelist and religious writer (died 1893)
May 1 – Junius Brutus Booth, English-born actor (died 1852)
May 4 – William H. Prescott, American historian (died 1859)
August 19 – Agnes Strickland, English historical writer and poet (died 1874)
September 19 – Hartley Coleridge, English poet, biographer and essayist (died 1849)
July 15 – Thomas Bulfinch, American writer on mythology (died 1867)
November 2 – Frederick Chamier, English novelist and Royal Navy captain (died 1870)
December 19 – Manuel Bretón de los Herreros, Spanish playwright (died 1873)

Deaths
January 13 – John Anderson, Scottish natural philosopher and scientist (born 1726)
February 17 – James Macpherson, Scottish poet (born 1736) 
March 6 – Guillaume Thomas François Raynal, French philosophical writer (born 1713)
May 6 – Adolf Freiherr Knigge, German writer on etiquette (born 1752)
June 7 – Elisabetta Caminèr Turra, Venetian writer and translator (born 1751)
June 8 – Jean-Marie Collot d'Herbois, French dramatist (born 1749)
July 21 – Robert Burns, Scottish poet (born 1759)
October 7 – Thomas Reid, Scottish philosopher (born 1710)
October 16 – Antoine-Joseph Pernety, French writer and mystic (born 1716)
December 24 – John Maclaurin, Lord Dreghorn, judge and poet (born 1734)

References

 
Years of the 18th century in literature